A potato cannon is a pipe-based cannon that uses air pressure (pneumatic), or combustion of a flammable gas (aerosol, propane, etc.), to launch projectiles at high speeds. They are built to fire chunks of potato, as a hobby, or to fire other sorts of projectiles, for practical use. Projectiles or failing guns can be dangerous and result in life-threatening injuries, including cranial fractures, enucleation, and blindness if a person is hit.

The potato cannon can trace its origin to the World War II-era Holman Projector, which was a shipboard anti-aircraft weapon.

Launcher types
All spud guns propel projectiles down their barrels using pressurised gas in the same manner as a firearm (although at a much lower pressure). There are four basic ways that spud guns may achieve this:

 By the release of compressed gas (normally air) through a valve; such a launcher is typically referred to as a pneumatic launcher, and its power is limited primarily by the pressure of the air supply, be that from a compressor, manual pump or bottled gas.
 By the combustion of a pre-pressurised fuel-air mixture; this is called a hybrid launcher, and yields higher pressures than that of a normal combustion spud gun, limited only by the construction of the launcher (generally a few hundred pounds-force per square inch).

Combustion launchers
Combustion powered spud guns typically have the least complex designs, the four basic elements of which are:
 A fuel system
 A combustion chamber
 An ignition source
 A barrel

In order to fire, the operator loads a projectile into the barrel, adds fuel to the combustion chamber (for example aerosols or propane), and triggers the ignition source (often using a piezoelectric barbecue igniter). The fuel then ignites, creating hot expanding gases, and forcing the projectile out of the barrel. Distances vary greatly depending on many factors, including the type of fuel used, the efficiency of the fuel/air ratio, the combustion chamber/barrel ratio, and the flight characteristics of the projectile. Common distances vary from 100 to 200 meters, and there is a reported case of a cannon exceeding 500 meters of range.

Advanced combustion launchers may include metered propane or calcium carbide (acetylene) injection to ensure proper fueling, chamber fans to mix the fuel with the air and accelerate venting of the chamber after firing, multiple spark gaps (spark strips) to decrease combustion time, and high-voltage ignition sources (flyback circuits, stun guns, camera flashes, etc.).

Combustion launchers are usually less powerful than their pneumatic or hybrid counterparts, especially when hairspray / alcohol is used as a propellant. Bottled oxygen can be added to the firing chamber, though this can cause an explosion of the pipe when firing, potentially injuring anyone nearby.

Pneumatic launchers

Pneumatic launchers are considered a little more difficult to build due to the need of a completely airtight construction. These cannons have four basic components:
 A filling valve
 An air chamber
 A pressure release valve
 A barrel

In a pneumatic spud gun, air is pumped into the pressure chamber. After the desired chamber pressure is reached, the pressure release valve is opened, allowing the gas to expand down the barrel, propelling the projectile forwards.

The filling valve is usually a commonly available type such as a Schrader or Presta valve but other assemblies to pressurise the cannon such as quick release connections with ball or check valves have been used.

The pressure release valve is often one of a variety of commercially available types such as a plumbing ball valve, an irrigation sprinkler valve or a quick exhaust valve. Experienced builders often make their own valves for this purpose to gain greater flow and faster actuation. The most common custom design used is the piston valve. Multiple valves arranged to be triggered together are occasionally used as an alternative to a single larger valve.

The range of pneumatic cannons is more variable than the range of combustion spud guns due to the increased variation possible in the components.

Pneumatic spud guns are generally more powerful than combustion spud guns.

Dry ice launchers

A dry ice cannon uses the sublimation of solid carbon dioxide to generate the gas pressure to propel a projectile and is a variation of the burst disk cannon.

The oldest examples simply involve dropping pieces of dry ice into a tube closed at one end and sealing the other end by jamming the projectile in. When the pressure of the carbon dioxide from the subliming dry ice builds high enough, the projectile will be blown out of the tube. The pressures of such devices are not very high as it only needs to build enough to overcome the static friction of the projectile jammed in the barrel. Tens of psi is most likely. The range is likely restricted to 100- yards.

A more modern example is the dry ice bomb launcher. A plastic bottle containing water has some dry ice added and is quickly sealed and dropped down a tube closed at one end. A projectile is inserted in after it. The water accelerates the sublimation of the dry ice and the pressure from the carbon dioxide gas produced eventually ruptures the plastic bottle and launches the projectile.

Due to the operation of a dry ice bomb cannon extra safety issues are present:

 The dry ice bomb used for propulsion can achieve bursting pressure in a matter of seconds to hours depending on the quantity of water and dry ice. If too little dry ice, it also may not achieve bursting pressure at all. These timing issues can cause belief that the cannon has failed to fire but attempting to unload the cannon may then provide the extra stress on the bottle needed for it to rupture.
 The piping and any reinforcement may be insufficiently strong for the high pressure spike when the dry ice bomb explodes and consequently rupture.
 The recoil of such cannons can be very great due to the high pressure combined with the large internal diameter piping needed for the bottles (5–9 cm; 2–3½ in) resulting in them being ill-suited for hand held firing.

Compared to the operation of other spud guns, dry ice bomb cannons are similar in firing principle to a light-gas gun of the pneumatic type; the plastic bottle performing the task of the burst disk albeit in a less controlled manner.

Another means of utilising dry ice in spud guns is to use the sublimation of dry ice to create substantial pressure behind a valve, and placing a barrel on the other side of that valve with a projectile loaded into it. Whilst this method is more controllable and in many means safer than utilising a soda bottle as a burst disk (provided pressure rated valves and piping are used), it is limited in that quick release valves, such as ball valves, are generally not bigger in diameter than 1 or 2 inches. Additionally, they cannot be opened as rapidly as a soda bottle will rupture, and consequently there is less immediate airflow. However, this is offset by the fact that such a design can operate at more than double the pressure of a typical dry ice bomb launcher, as soda bottles will rupture at only .

Hybrid launchers
A hybrid launcher consists of seven basic elements:

A fuel system (usually metered propane)
An air filling valve (see pneumatic launchers)
One or more pressure gauges
A high-pressure combustion chamber
A pressure-triggered main valve (burst disk)
A barrel
An ignition source (see combustion launchers)

A hybrid combines principles of combustion and pneumatic spud gun. It uses a pre-pressurised mixture of fuel and air to get more power out of a given chamber volume.

In order to fire, the operator first readies the pressure-triggered valve then injects several times the normal amount of fuel and appropriately more air. When the ignition source is triggered, the pressure from the combustion causes the main valve to open and propels the projectile out of the barrel with the released combustion gases. The hybrid is capable of higher velocities than a combustion or pneumatic spud gun because the pressure generated is higher than that in a combustion gun (for most fuels), and the shock wave moves faster than it can in a pneumatic (for most gases), due to the higher temperature. Projectiles fired by a hybrid have broken the sound barrier.

A hybrid using a fuel and air mix at twice atmospheric pressure is said to be using a 2X mix. Higher mixtures can be used and will produce even higher pressures. The fuel and air need to be measured and matched carefully to ensure reliable operation; hence the use of accurate air pressure gauges and fuel meters.

Vacuum cannons

Vacuum cannons differ from typical pneumatic cannons in that they apply a negative pressure to the front of the projectile in order to "pull" it out of the barrel. They typically fire light projectiles and do not have any practical applications outside of demonstrating air pressure theory.

Primary materials

Plastics

 PVC-U (Polyvinyl chloride, unplasticized): Highly popular due to its availability and relatively low cost. PVC pipes are available in a wide variety of sizes and pressure ratings. In industry, however, they are illegal for compressed air applications—if they are damaged under pressure the plastic can fail explosively. PVC should not be used in this application without extensive experience and understanding of the forces at play.
 ABS (Acrylonitrile butadiene styrene): Another popular plastic piping material, more expensive and less common than PVC but available in the same sizes and pressure ratings. Unlike PVC it is used in compressed air systems as it splits rather than shatters on failure. It also has a greater temperature tolerance (−40 °C to +80 °C, or −40 to 175 °F) compared to 0 °C to +60 °C or 30 to 140 °F for PVC).

Both PVC and ABS piping are also available in forms that are not pressure rated. The use of unrated plastic piping and fittings is a common source of cannon failure and poses a much greater risk to a cannon operator.

Metals
Steel: The very high-pressure rating of steel piping makes it a familiar sight on high-powered hybrid cannons. It is however much more expensive than any other common piping material. The extra weight and joining difficulties are also a consideration.
Copper: As a common plumbing material, copper pipes and associated fittings are readily available. They have higher pressure ratings and flow compared to similar plastic piping. The drawbacks are that copper is heavier, and up to four times the cost of PVC or ABS pipes of similar external diameters.
Aluminium: Aluminium is a lightweight metal with good corrosion resistance. Aluminium pipes are sometimes used as barrels on spud guns on their own and machined aluminium is a popular material for particularly unique designs.
Brass: Often brass fittings are used on spud guns for small parts of the construction like fuel systems, because it is one of the most common materials for small pipe fittings. Occasionally large parts of spud guns are machined entirely out of brass.

Valve types

Manual
Ball Valve: Made out of either plastic or metal, ball valves are considered inferior by many enthusiasts due to their slow opening times. For those on a tight budget or in low-power setups, ball valves are ideal. Some choose to modify their valves by attaching a pneumatic actuator or spring to achieve a faster opening speed.
Blowgun: A blowgun is a small handheld device used to blow away debris from a work area and is designed to be used attached to a compressed air line. It uses a sprung poppet valve operated by a lever to allow air through its body and out through a specially shaped nozzle. In spudgunning, it’s used to pilot larger valves—releasing a small volume of air to allow a piston or diaphragm to fly back and release a much larger volume of air into the barrel. It is also used as the primary valve for small cannons that fire airsoft pellets and so do not require high airflow. Blowguns can be modified to increase airflow.

Electric
Sprinkler valve (otherwise known as a solenoid valve): The use of irrigation sprinkler valves as pneumatic valves has become increasingly popular for spudgunning. These valves are intended to be electrically triggered causing a solenoid to depressurise a diaphragm and allow airflow through. It is also possible to remove the solenoid and, instead, to actuate the valve manually with a blowgun to depressurise the diaphragm. Such modifications allow the valve to open as much as 3 to 5 times faster.

Pneumatic
Diaphragm valve: A diaphragm valve is used in pneumatic cannons where the barrel is within the air chamber. It is a disk of flexible material mounted directly behind the barrel that seals it when pressure is increased behind the disk. The design is such that air leaks past the diaphragm from behind it to the chamber around the barrel, sealing the soft rubber against the butt of the barrel. Once the chamber is fully pressurised the compressed air behind the diaphragm is quickly vented, causing the centre of the diaphragm to flex backwards, exposing the butt of the barrel to the compressed air inside the chamber, which rapidly exhausts through the barrel, launching the projectile. Sprinkler valves have also been modified to act in the same manner a diaphragm valve operates; changing the triggering of the valve to a release of air controlled by a blowgun valve, rather than electronically.
Piston valve: The gold standard of pneumatic spudgunning is the piston valve, due to its extremely high rate of flow and opening speed. It works in an almost identical fashion to a diaphragm valve but replaces the flexible diaphragm with a hard rubber-faced piston. The valve opening is generally as wide as or wider than the barrel diameter, so there is very little constriction of airflow. Piston valves also open much faster than either ball or solenoid valves. However, construction of this type of valve is inherently complex, and some choose to order pre-built valves through the internet.
Quick Exhaust Valve (QEV): a commercial piston or diaphragm valve in a metal body intended for the quick venting of pneumatic cylinders. In spudgunning they are ideal barrel sealing valves with faster opening times than custom piston valves and high flow rates. They can be commonly found in sizes from ⅛ inch to 1½ inches (3–40 mm) and sometimes even larger models. It provides an easy option for inexperienced spud-gun builders but the cost is usually greater than for any other valve type.
 The Quick Dump Valve is a recent addition to the choices of valves for spudding.  A QDV is a spool valve that is balanced under pressure with one end of the spool oriented toward the barrel. The spool is manually unbalanced allowing pressure between the end of the spool and the projectile in the barrel.  The air pressure then forces the spool back and the projectile forward.  Since the valve is triggered with no pilot pressure, the valve snaps open with no pilot pressure to hinder it.  Currently it is not commercially for sale and must be hand built by the hobbyist like most piston valves.
Burst Disk Valve: Used in a few pneumatics but primarily in hybrid cannons, burst valves are considered the ideal pressure release mechanism as they allow an unobstructed flow of high pressure air. Burst disks have no moving parts, making them very reliable. They are very appealing for hybrid cannons because they can withstand the low pressure gas mix in the chamber before ignition, yet fail as planned upon successful ignition.  The high pressure combustion gases are released into the barrel at a rate which generates greater velocities than a mechanical valve could allow. Pneumatic cannon burst discs work similarly. The disc and projectile are loaded, and the chamber is pressurised until the disc ruptures. Unfortunately, this usually does not give the operators much in the way of control over timing, although a puncturing mechanism can be used. Burst disks are of no specific material and may consist of plastic or thin sheet metal or foil.

Alternate designs have also been used which use a sharp projectile to puncture the burst disk, like a mortar  or using a manual puncturing device to trigger failure of the disk. These allow total control over burst disk cannons without the need for hybrid technology and materials as simple as plastic tape can be used for the disk.

Burst disk cannons have also been made which are fired electrically, using a nichrome wire to trigger failure by heating.

Connections

Welding, soldering and gluing
Solvent welding: used for similar plastic connections using solvent fittings, the solvent temporarily dissolves the polymer chains of the plastic and the parts to be joined are brought together. On rehardening, the polymer chains from each part are entangled and so form a solid weld.
Metal welding: used to form strong joints between similar metals by melting the points of connection together. It is an uncommon process in spudgun construction due to the equipment necessary to make the welds.
Soldering: commonly used in the construction of copper pipe based spudguns, a solder with a lower melting point than the copper is melted and drawn into the gaps between pipe and fitting with capillary action, holding to pipe and fitting with a wetting action before hardening.
Gluing: the use of epoxy resin in small designs is common for the making of custom parts but it is rare to see glues used for structural connections. Epoxy resin is mostly used in applications where normal fittings would limit the possibilities.
Duct tape: sometimes used in simple cannons, it is unsuitable for sealing any significant pneumatic pressure and if used on a combustion cannon the heat produced can soften the adhesive and melt the tape, greatly weakening any seal or joint it creates.

Mechanical joints
Compression Fittings: primarily seen on copper pipe spudguns, the compression fitting squeezes a metal ring against the pipe between a nut and the fitting body to form the connection. Easier than solder fittings and requiring only a spanner they are much more expensive and are of greater weight.
Threaded Fittings: commonly available in BSP or NPT (not interchangeable) they generally require a fitting attached to a pipe by other means to allow screwing into another threaded fitting. The exception to this is steel pipe, the ends of which can have the appropriate thread cut into them.
Flange joints: on large steel spudguns, pipe and fittings are sometimes bolted together by means of flanges with a gasket sandwiched between them to provide an airtight joint.
Cam Locks: on spudguns with interchangeable barrels a cam lock is sometimes used to connect barrels to the cannon as it provides a quick and simple solution to switching barrels. Two levers either side of the socket side of the fitting rotate internal cams to lock in or release the plug side of the fitting to which a barrel is attached.

The sound barrier
It is rare for a spud gun to be powerful enough to break the sound barrier, although there are some cases of this happening using specialized designs. The spud guns used are typically hybrids; but some pneumatic cannons have achieved the feat, either by using a special low-density gas, such as helium, or high pressures combined with a fast valve. There is also one reported case of a combustion design achieving super-sonic velocities.

The difficulty in breaking the barrier arises from the speed of the particles within the gas. The projectile cannot travel faster than the gas particles, which are limited to travel at the speed of sound. The problem is solved by increasing the speed of the particles, either by:

Using lighter molecules, as occurs when helium is used in a pneumatic.
Heating the gases to far higher temperatures, and thus giving them more energy. This allows hybrids and combustions to achieve supersonic velocities.
CO2 gas, although it can reach these pressures, is not suitable due to its high density.

Supersonic velocities may theoretically be attained by pneumatics with a sufficiently large "dead space" between the main valve and projectile. The incoming air can raise the pressure rapidly in this dead space, creating high temperatures sometimes sufficient to achieve supersonic velocities. This particular effect has not yet been successfully used, but has been discussed, as both adiabatic and shock heating are documented phenomena in gases.

Supersonic velocities have been obtained using the related vacuum bazooka with a de Laval nozzle. This also relies on significantly lowering the density of the gas.

Practical uses
Although spudguns are created and used for the purpose of recreation there are other devices which work on identical principles in many other fields with more serious uses.

Entertainment
Promotional sports cannons: Portable pneumatic cannons which run on bottled CO2 are common at large sports games in the U.S. where they are used to project items such as T-shirts or wrapped food into the audience. Such cannons can be dangerous: the Phillie Phanatic injured a fan with a hot dog cannon in June 2018. Such "air cannons", as they are often called, tend to be made of higher-quality materials than an average pneumatic spudgun, but they use the same methods of operation.
Special effects cannons: In film and theatre productions, pneumatic cannons (such as an air mortar) are often used as a pyrotechnic-free method of material projection. These can vary from simple ball valve, manually operated models to electronically triggered designs operated from a remote control panel depending on the exact requirements.
Golf ball launchers:  at some charity outings players can make a donation and launch a golf ball over 300 yards and use that as their tee shot. Usually the vendor hired by the  event organizer launches the ball for safety and liability reasons.

Industry

Hail cannons: these are very large devices which consist of a combustion chamber and a large funnel shape mounted on top of it. A gas mix is ignited in the combustion chamber and the funnel directs the blast wave upwards. They are intended to protect crops from hail damage by disrupting hail formation with the shock waves. There has however been no scientific proof of their effectiveness.
Air cannons: This can mean:
 A pneumatic spudgun
 Air cannon (mechanics), a compressed air device for creating high pressure shock waves under water
Bird scarers: these devices are essentially automatic combustion cannons. They require bottled propane gas and a lead-acid battery. At intervals they ignite a propane/air mix to produce a loud explosion (up to 150 decibels close to the device) to scare birds from crop fields or near airport runways.
Chicken cannons: Many aircraft parts must be able to survive the impact of a bird in flight, known as a birdstrike. Pneumatic guns are used to project a bird, typically a dead chicken, into a product designed to imitate a birdstrike. Aircraft canopies, engines, and critical flight control surfaces will normally undergo this type of stress testing to determine whether they are strong enough to withstand a birdstrike in flight.
Shock tubes: used to test hypersonic and supersonic combustion ramjets.
Pneumatic line throwers for launching lines for rescue missions or between ships for replenishment at sea as well as a number of other applications.

Military
Combustion light-gas guns are weaponised combustion cannons which burn a low-molecular-weight gas such as hydrogen to provide a higher specific impulse than relatively high-molecular-weight conventional solid propellants.

Safety
Spud guns by nature are hazardous and can present safety issues if poorly constructed or used.

Users should follow the same rules as if handling a conventional firearm (see gun safety), but given the frequently improvised materials and construction used in spudguns, it is particularly important for the user to use basic ear and eye protection when operating a spudgun.

Legal issues

In some jurisdictions spud guns are outlawed or have restrictions on their use and may require licenses and certification of the gun.

In popular culture

 In the "Workaholics" episode "To Friend a Predator", a Potato Gun is used in an attempt to stop the protagonist, but instead hits Blake in the back.
 In The Trailer Park Boys, Julian, Ricky, Bubbles, Corey and Trevor use spud guns to investigate the enormous damage to their crops of cannabis. This was because real guns would attract too much attention.
 In the film Tremors 3: Back to Perfection, Jack Sawyer suggested to Burt Gummer that they build a potato gun to fight the Ass-Blasters. Using parts from a junkyard, they formed a variant of a potato gun that shot makeshift flaming arrows that were deadly to the Ass Blasters and killed two.
 In an episode of Nickelodeon's Drake & Josh, Drake buys a potato gun, accidentally hitting Josh, making him drop the weights he was lifting, causing him to break his foot.
 Dwight Schrute on the U.S. version of The Office has mentioned owning a spud gun in more than one episode.
 In 14th episode of Season 4 of Prison Break, a combustion potato gun is used by Michael Scofield to launch 40 mm smoke grenades.
 The Simpsons character Maude Flanders was killed by air-cannon launched T-shirts in the eleventh season episode, "Alone Again, Natura-Diddily".
 In Duct Tape Forever (the movie based on The Red Green Show) Edgar K. B. Montrose says to sell them as toys to the kids to raise money.
 In the movie Aliens in the Attic the kids build a spud gun that they use to fight aliens invading Earth.
 A MythBusters episode tested a potato cannon held together by duct tape compared to one held together using PVC bonding agent.  Another episode, testing MacGyver myths, supplied Adam and Jamie with the materials to build a potato cannon as part of a challenge to "MacGyver" up a way to signal a rescue helicopter; however, they used the piping and other supplies present to build a large kite instead.
 In the TV series House, M.D. episode "The Dig", House is attending a spud gun show with Thirteen, where he uses the spud gun to threaten a teenage competitor who taunts House.
A spud gun was one of the many different weapons used in Bully, a game made by Rockstar Games. There were two types. One can be carried around the map, but could only fire eight potatoes before having to get more ammunition. The other one was a mounted gun that the Nerds used at the observatory during a story mission facing a second boss.
In Iron Man 3, Tony meets a boy named Harley, who owns a potato gun which he uses to threaten Tony. At the end of the movie, as thanks for his help, Tony builds Harley a newer and better potato gun.
The game Scrap Mechanic has 4 variants of spud guns: a single shot spud gun, a double barrel spud shot gun which fires French fries, a 'spudling' gun which is a triple barrel Gatling gun, and a mountable spud gun which can be mounted on your creations.

See also 

 Airgun
 FN 303
 Paintball gun
 Plastic pressure pipe systems
 Pneumatic gun
 Pumpkin chucking
 Vacuum bazooka

References

External links

 How Pneumatic Potato Cannons Work —Audio slideshow from the National High Magnetic Field Laboratory
 Spud gun building instructions — Spud Gun plans, animations, construction how-tos

Air guns
Pneumatic weapons